West Central may refer to:

 West Central (London Assembly constituency)
 WC postcode area
 West Central (General Electors Communal Constituency, Fiji), a former electoral division of Fiji
 West Central Wireless